Slak (Iślaq) is a rural locality (a selo) in Alsheyevsky District, Bashkortostan, Russia. The population was 956 as of 2010. There are 15 streets.

Geography 
Slak is located 22 km southwest of Rayevsky (the district's administrative centre) by road. Shafranovo is the nearest rural locality.

References 

Rural localities in Alsheyevsky District